Mordvins or Mordva may refer to:

Communities and ethnic groups 
 Mordens a collection of Uralic-speaking ethnic groups forming an alliance starting from ca 5 c AD till 1230
 Morducani, a historical term for Mordens alliance dynasty
 Mordvins, an obsolete official term for the Erzyas and Mokshas as a single ethnic group in Russian Federation since 1928
 Mordvins (term for Jews), used by non-Jewish peoples to denote all Jews in Volga-Ural

Languages 
  Mordvin language, an obsolete but official term for both Erzya and Moksha languages in Russian Federation since 1928
 Mordvinic languages, an obsolete term for Erzya and Moksha languages now included into Finnic languages in 2016

People 
 Mordva (slur), derogatory term for Erzya or Moksha
 Mordvinov, a list of people with the name

Places 
 Mordovia, the official Russian name for Erzya and Moksha Republic established in 1928

Arts and entertainment 
 Mordovian cuisine, an article about Russian and Tatar cuisine in Mordovia
 Mordovian national costume, an article about Erzya national costume as single Mordvin
 Mordovian Ornament, an article about figure skating
 Mordvin Native Religion, an article about Erzyan native religion and its the modern revival

See also 
 
 Mordvin Jews, historical Jewish community in Mordovia
 Mordvin Tatars, historical Russian term used to refer to nobility of Volga Tatar, Volga Finnic and Burtas descent
 Mordovka, a historical Russian currency

Language and nationality disambiguation pages